Mike Johnson (born 1946) is an American country music yodeler, singer, and songwriter living in Arlington, Virginia. Also known as Country Music's No.1 Black Yodeler, and Black Yodel No.1.

Raised in a Catholic family in Washington, DC, Johnson began yodeling in the 1950s, imitating the "Tarzan yell" of actor Johnny Weissmuller. Johnson enlisted in the US Navy in 1965 and served two Vietnam tours from 1967 to 1969 on the USS Constellation CVA-64. He did his first professional recording session at Globe Recording Studio in April 1981 in Nashville, and released his first 45rpm single "King of the Fish." In September 1981 he became a long distance trucker for Newlon's Transfer of Arlington, Va. Johnson founded Pata del Lobo Music publishing in 1982, and Roughshod Records and You and Me Records in 1987. Johnson has since released 2 45rpm vinyls, 11 cassettes, and 61 CDs.

Awards and recognition
Inducted into America's Old-Time Country Music Hall Of Fame by The National Traditional Country Music Association at the 27th Annual Old-Time Country Music Festival, in Avoca, Iowa, September 2002
114 of his yodels were acquired by the Library of Congress' Recorded Sound Reference Center's permanent music collection in April 2007
received Lifetime Achievement Award from National Traditional Country Music Association in August 2016 at 41st Annual Old Time Country Music Festival, LeMars, Iowa.
Johnson received a 2017 Legendary Honky Tonk CD of the Year Award from the National Traditional Country Music Association at their 2017 Old Time Country Music Festival in LeMars, Iowa.

Works

Discography
King of the Fish (single 1981)
Hooked on Rodeo (single 1985)
Did You Hug Your Mother Today? (single 1994)
Black Yodel No.1, The Song, The Songwriter (1999)
Dig You Hug Your Mother Today? (1999)
Doggone It I’ve Written A Sad Song Again (2014)
Mike Johnson Yodeling 40 Years (2006)

Compilations
Rough Guide to Yodel (2006)

Books

References

External links
Roughshod Records

Yodelers
Country musicians from Virginia
American country singer-songwriters
African-American country musicians
People from Arlington County, Virginia
1946 births
Living people
African-American songwriters
21st-century African-American people
20th-century African-American people
Singer-songwriters from Virginia